The Ostryanyn uprising was a 1638 Cossack uprising against the Polish–Lithuanian Commonwealth. It was sparked by an act of the Sejm (legislature) passed the same year that declared that non-Registered Cossacks were equal to ordinary peasants in their rights, and hence were subjected to enserfment. The uprising was initially led by Cossack Hetman Yakiv Ostryanyn but was eventually crushed.

Course 
According to a chronicle of 1864 written by Samuil Velichko, Ostryanyn, who had just been elected Hetman, issued an address to the Little Russian people on the eve of the campaign in March 1638. He declared that he would "go with his army to the Ukraine in order to liberate the Orthodox people from the yoke of oppression and torment of the Polish tyranny and claim vengeance for grievances, ruin and torturous abuse... suffered by the entire Russian populace, living on both sides of the Dnieper."

Ostryanyn also called on the people of Ukraine to join the insurgency and to beware of the Registered Cossacks. His leaflets were spread across Ukraine, reaching as far as Pokuttya. His appeal was carried and distributed by the Cossack elders, bandurists, youth, and according to Ostryanyn, even Orthodox monks. People began to prepare for an uprising, some going to Zaporozhye, while others sent food, money, and gunpowder.

The rebels left Zaporozhye and divided themselves into three detachments. The first, moving down the left bank of the Dnieper, was led by Ostryanyn himself. His force took Kremenchuk and moved on to Khorol and Omelnyk. The second body of troops, consisting of a flotilla led by Hunia, took the river crossings in Kremenchuk, Maksymivka, Buzhyn and Chyhyryn. The third force occupied the right bank of the Dnieper.

Defeat 
Ostryanyn's force was defeated at the Battle of Zhovnyn, near Zhovnyn in the Kiev Voivodeship. Subsequently, the Cossacks elected a new Hetman in the person of Dmytro Hunia. However, soon the uprising was quelled by Polish–Lithuanian forces led by Jeremi Wiśniowiecki and Mikołaj Potocki. After a series of further skirmishes, the Cossacks capitulated at the Starzec river. Hunia and some other Cossacks managed to flee to Muscovy (see Chuhuiv).

In literature 
The uprising was described in detail by Szymon Okolski, a well-known Polish historian, theologian, and specialist in heraldry. He witnessed and directly participated in the uprisings, and his field diaries became a valuable information source for historians and novelists.

The uprising forms part of the plot of the romanticized historical novel Taras Bulba, written in 1834 by Nikolai Gogol, a Ukrainian-born Russian dramatist and novelist. The book tells the story of an old Zaporozhian Cossack, Taras Bulba, and his two sons, Andriy and Ostap. The three men set out on an epic journey to join other Cossacks and participate in the Zaporozhia Cossack uprisings including the Ostryanyn Uprising.

References

External links 
 "Dyaryusz transactiey wojennej między wojskiem koronnem i zaporoskiem w r. 1637 miesiąca Grudnia przez Mikołaja Potockiego zaczętej i dokończonej», (Zamość, 1638) - field diary concerning the 1637 Cossack rebellion; 
Kontynuacya dyaryusza wojennego etc. (Kraków, 1639) - continuation of Okolski's field notes of the Cossacks neutralization. In 1738 both diaries were translated to Russian by historian Stephan Lukomski. 

Cossack uprisings
17th century in the Zaporozhian Host
Rebellions in Ukraine
Conflicts in 1638
1638 in Europe
1630s in the Polish–Lithuanian Commonwealth
17th-century rebellions